Charles, Count of Armagnac may refer to:

Charles I, Count of Armagnac (r. 1473–1497)
Charles IV, Duke of Alençon and Count of Armagnac (r. 1509–1525)
Charles de Lorraine, Count of Armagnac (r. 1718–1751)